Mike Sinyard is the founder and chairman of Specialized Bicycle Components, an American manufacturer of bicycles and cycling components. In 2022, he retired as the CEO of Specialized Bicycle Components, a company he had led for 48 years.

Early Career 
Specialized Bicycle Components was founded by Mike Sinyard in 1974, when he was 24 years old. Sinyard had previously traveled to Europe and established an import business relationship with Cinelli, an Italian bike component manufacturer. He started Specialized by importing and assembling bikes from Italian components and also ran an import service that provided these sought-after parts to California bike shops. Within four years, the company was making approximately $18 million and began selling complete bikes. In 1981, Sinyard created the Specialized Stumpjumper the first mass-produced mountain bike.

He was profiled in the 2007 documentary film Klunkerz: A Film About Mountain Bikes.

Awards and recognition 
Sinyard is a founding member of the International Mountain Bicycling Association (IMBA) and the National Interscholastic Cycling Association (NICA). The Specialized Stumpjumper mountain bike was added to the Smithsonian National Museum of American History's collection in 1994. He's been recognized for his contributions to the cycling industry, including being inducted into the Mountain Bike Hall of Fame in 1988 and the U.S. Bicycling Hall of Fame in 2011.

References

External links 
Mike Sinyard interview with CNN money, May 2008
Klunkerz: A Film About Mountain Bikes Mike Sinyard Bio

Cycle designers
American sports businesspeople
San Jose State University alumni
Living people
Mountain bike innovators
Year of birth missing (living people)